This article is about the particular significance of the year 1846 to Wales and its people.

Incumbents

Lord Lieutenant of Anglesey – Henry Paget, 1st Marquess of Anglesey 
Lord Lieutenant of Brecknockshire – Penry Williams
Lord Lieutenant of Caernarvonshire – Peter Drummond-Burrell, 22nd Baron Willoughby de Eresby 
Lord Lieutenant of Cardiganshire – William Edward Powell
Lord Lieutenant of Carmarthenshire – George Rice, 3rd Baron Dynevor 
Lord Lieutenant of Denbighshire – Robert Myddelton Biddulph   
Lord Lieutenant of Flintshire – Sir Stephen Glynne, 9th Baronet
Lord Lieutenant of Glamorgan – John Crichton-Stuart, 2nd Marquess of Bute 
Lord Lieutenant of Merionethshire – Edward Lloyd-Mostyn, 2nd Baron Mostyn
Lord Lieutenant of Monmouthshire – Capel Hanbury Leigh
Lord Lieutenant of Montgomeryshire – Edward Herbert, 2nd Earl of Powis
Lord Lieutenant of Pembrokeshire – Sir John Owen, 1st Baronet
Lord Lieutenant of Radnorshire – John Walsh, 1st Baron Ormathwaite

Bishop of Bangor – Christopher Bethell 
Bishop of Llandaff – Edward Copleston 
Bishop of St Asaph – William Carey (until 13 September); Thomas Vowler Short (from 27 October) 
Bishop of St Davids – Connop Thirlwall (from 9 August)

Events
14 January - 35 men are killed in a mining accident at Risca.
March - A speech by William Williams, MP for Coventry, on the subject of education and the Welsh language leads to the commissioning of a report.
27 June - Thomas Frankland Lewis is created a baronet.
1 August - Opening of the Aberdare railway.
3 August - Mary Cornelia Edwards of Plas Machynlleth marries George Vane-Tempest, 5th Marquess of Londonderry.
October - New bridge over the River Towy at Llandeilo collapses under construction.
date unknown
The new cast-iron Llandinam Bridge in Montgomeryshire is opened.
The rebuilt Beaumaris Pier is partially opened.
Halkyn-born Mormon missionary Dan Jones becomes mission president of the Church of Jesus Christ of Latter-day Saints in Wales, concentrating the church's efforts around Merthyr Tydfil, publishing (from July) the Welsh language monthly Prophwyd y Jubili and also the tract Hanes Saint y Dyddiau Diweddaf.
The Cambrian Archaeological Association is founded by Harry Longueville Jones and John Williams (Ab Ithel) and launches its journal Archaeologia Cambrensis.

Arts and literature

New books
Griffith Edwards (Gutyn Padarn) - Gwaith Prydyddawl
Daniel Silvan Evans - Telynegion
Sir Samuel Rush Meyrick - Heraldic Visitations of Wales and Part of the Marches between the years 1586 and 1613...
William Morgan (Gwilym Gelli-deg) - Cerbyd Awen

Music
Y Salmydd Cenedlaethol (collection of hymns)

Births
8 January - Henry Bracy, tenor (d. 1917)
1 October - John Cadvan Davies, minister and poet (d. 1823)
17 October - Mary Davies (Mair Eifion), poet (d. 1882)
24 November - Tom Hurry Riches, steam locomotive engineer (d. 1911)
6 December - James Charles, theologian (d. 1920)
28 December - William Frost, harpist (d. 1891)
3 August - Samuel M. Jones, mayor of Toledo, Ohio (d. 1904)

Deaths
9 March - William Hughes, composer, 88
28 March - Daniel Evans (Daniel Ddu o Geredigion), poet, 53
26 June - Honoratus Leigh Thomas, surgeon, 77
29 July - John Owens, educational benefactor, 55
13 September – William Carey, Bishop of St Asaph, 76
October - John Evans, surgeon and cartographer, 90
3 December - Daniel Jones, missionary, 33
5 December - Sir Charles Morgan, 2nd Baronet, politician, 86

References

 
Wales